Hisham Mohamed Ashour (born May 29, 1982 in Cairo) is a professional squash player who represents Egypt. He is the older brother of Ramy Ashour. He reached a career-high world ranking of World No. 11 in February 2012.

References

External links 
 
 
 
 

Egyptian male squash players
Living people
1982 births
Sportspeople from Cairo
21st-century Egyptian people